Sandugo is a 2019 Philippine drama television series starring Ejay Falcon, and Aljur Abrenica. The series premiered on ABS-CBN's Kapamilya Gold afternoon block and worldwide via The Filipino Channel from September 30, 2019 to March 20, 2020, replacing Precious Hearts Romances Presents: Los Bastardos.

Series overview

Episodes

Season 1

References

Lists of Philippine drama television series episodes